Coin Coin Chapter Two: Mississippi Moonchile is a studio album by Matana Roberts. It is the second installment of the 12-part Coin Coin series. It was released by Constellation Records October 1, 2013.

Track listing

Personnel
Matana Roberts: alto saxophone, vocals, conduction, wordspeak
Shoko Nagai: piano, vocals
Jason Palmer: trumpet, vocals
Jeremiah Abiah: operatic tenor vocals
Thomson Kneeland: double bass, vocals
Tomas Fujiwara: drums, vocals

References

2013 albums
Coin Coin 2